Neilston Pad, referred to locally as The Pad, is a distinctive hill in East Renfrewshire, situated a mile (1.5 km) south of the village of Neilston.

Its odd shape and prominence make it easily identifiable and visible from many areas in Glasgow.

The area was managed by Elderslie Estates from the 1990s until it was sold to a private buyer or consortium in 2021.

Walking and public access 

Neilston Pad has a well constructed gravel path surrounding it extending to access paths from the north and south. A number of secondary paths exist, one of which leads to the summit.

Summit 

There is large stone cairn on the plateau which is easily mistaken as being the summit.

Reservoirs 

The area surrounding Neilston Pad includes a number of reservoirs. Craighall Reservoir, known locally as Craighall Dam, lies to the west, Snypes Reservoir to the east and a smaller body of water sits north known as Keepers Dam.

Forestry 

The hill itself has extensive forestry on its eastern and southern sides as well as large areas alongside its eastern side.

In 2019 up to 20,000 trees were felled to prevent the spread of phytophthora ramorum – a fungus-like pathogen that can kill or severely damage larch trees. The felling damaged and disturbed a number of well utilised walking and access routes mainly around Craighall Reservoir.

Gallery

References 

Landforms of East Renfrewshire
Neilston